A by-election was held for the Australian House of Representatives seat of Kooyong on 24 August 1910. This was triggered by the resignation of Commonwealth Liberal Party (CLP) MP William Knox. It is the first by-election to be triggered by the resignation of the sitting member who did not then re-contest the seat in the by-election.

The election was won by CLP candidate Robert Best.

Results

See also
 List of Australian federal by-elections

References

1910 elections in Australia
Victorian federal by-elections
1910s in Victoria (Australia)